Neil Winter (born 21 March 1974) is a Welsh pole vaulter.

He won the gold medal at the 1994 Commonwealth Games. He also competed at the 1996 Olympic Games without reaching the final round.

His personal best jump is 5.60 metres, achieved in August 1992 in San Giuliano Terme.

Neil's successes began as a junior athlete and, as at September 2013, he still holds the British records in the under 20 (5.50 metres), under 17 (5.20 metres), and under 13 (3.40 metres) categories.

Neil was inducted into the Welsh Athletics Hall of Fame in November 2014.

References

1973 births
Living people
Welsh pole vaulters
British male pole vaulters
Athletes (track and field) at the 1996 Summer Olympics
Olympic athletes of Great Britain
Commonwealth Games gold medallists for Wales
Athletes (track and field) at the 1994 Commonwealth Games
Commonwealth Games medallists in athletics
Medallists at the 1994 Commonwealth Games